Albania and Palestine established diplomatic relations in 1990. Albania had already recognized Palestine as a state since 1988. Palestine has an embassy in Tirana, but Albania does not have an embassy in Palestine. Both are member of the Organisation of Islamic Cooperation.

History

After the proclamation of the Palestinian Independence, Albania officially recognized the Palestinian State in 1988 and in 1989 the Embassy of the State of Palestine, with full diplomatic representation, was officially opened in Albania. With the opening of the Embassy, the relations between Albania and Palestine further enhanced by the visit of then Palestinian President Yasser Arafat at the end of 1996.

Notwithstanding Albania's historically strong relationship with Israel, ties between the two countries have remained cordial. Albania was one of the 41 countries that abstained in the voting for the application of Palestine for non-member observer state of the United Nations on 29 November 2012.

In 2015, Albania was one of the 119 UN-member countries (out of 193) that voted in favor of raising the Palestinian flag at the UN.

See also
 Foreign relations of Albania
 Foreign relations of Palestine
 International recognition of the State of Palestine
 United Nations General Assembly resolution 67/19

References

External links

Palestine
Albania